Igede is a language spoken in Lower Benue State and Cross River State, Nigeria, by 461,000 people. Igede is a tripartite referring as well to the "people" and the "igede land" that is occupied by the Igede people.

References

Richard Bergman, 1981. An outline of Igede grammar

Languages of Nigeria
Volta–Niger languages